A Very British Scandal is a 2021 historical drama television miniseries, starring Claire Foy as Margaret Campbell, Duchess of Argyll and Paul Bettany as Ian Campbell, 11th Duke of Argyll. Its production company, Blueprint Pictures, previously made A Very English Scandal (2018), about the Thorpe affair. Written and created by Sarah Phelps, A Very British Scandal premiered in the United Kingdom on BBC One on 26 December 2021. It was released on Amazon Prime Video on 22 April 2022. Foy won "Best Actress", during the Broadcasting Press Guild Awards for her performance.

Synopsis
The three-episode series dramatises the marriage of Margaret and Ian Campbell, 11th Duke of Argyll and Chief of Clan Campbell, and the media frenzy surrounding their 1963 Argyll v Argyll divorce case.

Ian Campbell, 11th Duke of Argyll, is a member of the House of Lords in the 1960s. He meets Margaret Sweeny and falls in love with her while he is still married to his second wife Louise.

After marrying Margaret, Ian Campbell announces that he intends to leave his estate to his oldest son. Margaret―who stands to gain nothing if her new husband passes away―starts rumors that Ian's children are illegitimate.

It became a notorious and scandalous legal case, featuring accusations of adultery, forgery, theft, violence, drug use, and bribery. The series explores the social and political climate of postwar Britain, and attitudes toward women in the 1960s.

Cast

Production
In March 2021, it was announced that Claire Foy and Paul Bettany had been cast in the lead roles of A Very British Scandal, a follow-up to 2018's A Very English Scandal, and that Sarah Phelps would write and executive produce, with Anne Sewitsky directing and executive producing.

The series was filmed in Scotland and England, including at Scotland's Inveraray Castle (home of the Duke of Argyll), Glen Etive in the Scottish Highlands, Edinburgh's Parliament House, the Sheraton Grand London Park Lane Hotel, Kimpton Fitzroy London Hotel, Goldsmiths' Hall in London, and the Rivoli Ballroom in London.

Episodes

Release
The series premiered in the United Kingdom on BBC One on December 26, 2021, and released in the United States, Canada, Australia, and New Zealand on Prime Video on April 22, 2022.

In the United States, Amazon has entitled A Very British Scandal as the 2nd season of A Very English Scandal.

Critical reception
Lucy Mangan of The Guardian gave the series five out of five stars, praising the writing and casting of the leads, as well as the portrayal of Margaret Campbell as an independent woman but not as a heroic figure. Ed Cumming of The Independent also gave the series five out of five stars, writing that Foy and Bettany are "both exceptional." Carol Midgley of The Times was less complimentary, awarding three out of five stars, but also praising Foy. Anita Singh of The Daily Telegraph gave it two out of five stars, criticising the shift in tone and style from A Very English Scandal, and feeling that it failed to make Margaret a sympathetic character.

Awards and nominations

Sources

External links
 

2021 British television series debuts
2021 British television series endings
2020s British television miniseries
BBC television dramas
English-language television shows
Television series by Amazon Studios
Television series by Sony Pictures Television
Television series set in the 1960s
Television series set in the 1950s
Television shows filmed in the United Kingdom
Amazon Prime Video original programming